The Pier-2 Art Center is an art center in Yancheng District, Kaohsiung, Taiwan.

History
The arts center was originally an abandoned warehouse site due to Kaohsiung's shift from industrial city to service city. The warehouses were built in 1973. Due to the persistence of local artists, the area was finally released and remade to be an arts center. In 2006, the Bureau of Cultural Affairs of Kaohsiung City Government and under management of the Kaohsiung Pier-2 Art Development Association and Shu-Te University's art development workshop took over the center, starting a series of exhibitions.

On 9 March 2021 at 1:04 a.m., a fire broke out at one of the warehouse building of the center. The fire was extinguished two hours later which left the building with only its concrete walls and metal frames.

Buildings

 Hamasen Museum of Taiwan Railway, located at Warehouse 7 and 8
 Art Plaza
 Bicycle Warehouse
 C1+C2 Warehouse
 C3 Warehouse
 C5 Warehouse
 Dayi Warehouse
 Moonlight Theater
 P2 Warehouse
 Penglai Warehouse
 Warehouse 9
 West Coast Bike Path

Transportation
The center is accessible within walking distance South West from Yanchengpu Station of Kaohsiung MRT. 
Since 2017, Dayi Pier-2 Station(駁二大義) and Penglai Pier-2 Station(駁二蓬萊) of Kaohsiung LRT pass through the Pier-2 Art Center.

See also
 List of tourist attractions in Taiwan
 Shu-Te University

References

External links

 
 Kaohsiung Pier-2 Art Center draws record crowds
 The Pier 2 Art Center

1973 establishments in Taiwan
Art centers in Kaohsiung